Beatriz Saavedra was a Mexican actress, best known for appearing in films such as Monte de piedad (1951), Tres hombres en mi vida (1952), Tío de mi vida (1952), It Happened in Acapulco (1953), La ladrona (1954), Madame X (1955), Drop the Curtain (1955), La doncella de piedra (1956), and La culta dama (1957).

Selected filmography
Confessions of a Taxi Driver (1949)
A Gringo Girl in Mexico (1951)
Full Speed Ahead (1951)
La miel se fue de la luna (1952)
The Plebeian (1953)
Mercy (1953)
The Magnificent Beast (1953)
It Happened in Acapulco (1953)
Dreams of Glory (1953)
Se solicitan modelos (1954)
Madame X (1955)
Drop the Curtain (1955)

References

Bibliography
García Riera, Emilio (1969a). Historia documental del cine mexicano: 1949. Ediciones Era.
de la Vega Alfaro, Eduardo (1998). El cine de Marga López. Universidad de Guadalajara.
García Riera, Emilio (1997). Historia documental del cine mexicano, Volumen 18. Universidad de Guadalajara.
Peredo Castro, Francisco (2000). Alejandro Galindo, un alma rebelde en el cine mexicano. Conaculta/Imcine.
García Riera, Emilio (1969b). Historia documental del cine mexicano: 1952. Ediciones Era.
García Riera, Emilio (1990). Los hermanos Soler. Universidad de Guadalajara.
García Riera, Emilio; Macotela, Fernando (1984). La guía del cine mexicano de la pantalla grande a la televisión, 1919–1984. Editorial Patria.
Amador, María Luisa (1985). Cartelera cinematográfica, 1950–1959. UNAM.
García Riera, Emilio (1993). Historia documental del cine mexicano: 1955–1956. Universidad de Guadalajara.

External links

Year of birth unknown
Year of death unknown
Mexican film actresses
20th-century Mexican actresses